Rankin may refer to:

Places

Australia
Division of Rankin, an electoral district in the Australian Federal House of Representatives, in Queensland

Canada
Rankin Inlet, Nunavut
Rankin Inlet Airport, Nunavut
Rankin River, Ontario
Rankin Location 15D, Batchawana First Nation, Ontario
Rankin Lake, Nova Scotia

United States
Rankin, Illinois
Rankin, Missouri
Rankin, Oklahoma
Rankin, Pennsylvania
Rankin Bridge, a bridge in Pennsylvania
Rankin (Ellis County), Texas
Rankin (Upton County), Texas
Rankin, Wisconsin
Rankin County, Mississippi
Rankin Independent School District, Texas

Other uses
Rankin (name), a last name and given name and list of people with the name
Rankin (photographer)
HMAS Rankin (SSG 78)
USS Rankin (AKA-103)
Modified Rankin scale, a measure of disability

See also
Rankin v. McPherson
Rankine